Klavdiya Vadimovna Vysokova (born 23 July 1996), known professionally as Klava Koka, is a Russian singer, songwriter, and YouTuber. Vysokova began her professional career in 2015, being signed to Russian record label Black Star after winning the casting show Molodaya krov ("Young blood").

Early life and education
Vysokova was born in Yekaterinburg on 23 July 1996. When she was a teenager, she moved with her family to Moscow. After completing her secondary education, Vysokova enrolled in the Russian Presidential Academy of National Economy and Public Administration to study public service and management.

In 2012, she competed in the singing competition Ya - artist, where she reached the final.

Career
In 2015, Vysokova released her debut studio album Kusto, consisting of country pop songs. That year, she took part in the music competition show Glavnaya Stsena, the third Russian incarnation of The X Factor. In the show, her style of performing was criticized by celebrity mentors Diana Arbenina, Irina Allegrova, Valery Leontiev, and Nikolai Noskov.

Later in 2015, Vysokova competed in the casting show Molodaya krov. She ultimately won, and was signed to Russian label Black Star as part of her prize. In 2017, she launched her YouTube channel, where she began performing covers of foreign songs translated into the Russian language. The following year, she became a host on the travel show Oryol i Reshka.

In 2019, Klava Koka radically changed her image and musical style with the release of the single "Vlyublena v MDK". She subsequently released her second studio album Neprilichno o lichnom later that year. In 2021, Vysokova was included as one of the 30 Most Promising Russians Under 30 by Forbes Russia. Vysokova is also a Russian advertising face of brands such as Pepsi, Garnier, and KitKat.

Discography

Studio albums

Singles

Awards and nominations

References

External links

Klava Koka on TvStar

1996 births
21st-century Russian singers
21st-century Russian women singers
Living people
Musicians from Moscow
Musicians from Yekaterinburg
Russian pop singers
Russian Presidential Academy of National Economy and Public Administration alumni
Russian YouTubers
Russian TikTokers
Music YouTubers